Chocolate-covered cherries are a traditional popular dessert confection. Variations include cherry cordials with liquid fillings often including cherry liqueur, as well as chocolate-covered candied cherries and chocolate-covered dried cherries.

Major U.S. brands of chocolate-covered cherries include Cella's, Brach's, Queen Anne's (World's Finest Chocolate), and Marich Confectionery.

The National Confectioners Association in the United States has designated January 3 as "National Chocolate-Covered Cherry Day."

In popular culture
Chocolate-covered cherries feature in the story-line of the South Park episode Simpsons Already Did It.

See also
 Cherry Mash
 Chocolate-covered prune
 Chocolate-covered raisins
 Chocolate-covered fruit
 List of chocolate-covered foods
 List of cherry dishes
 Rocky Road dessert

Notes

References

Further reading
 

Chocolate-covered foods
Cherry dishes